Werner Pawlok (born 1953 in Stuttgart) is a German artist and photographer known for his celebrity and art photography, especially for his work with the 20×24-inch Polaroid Camera.

Work 
Werner Pawlok started his first studio in 1977 as a self-taught photographer. In the same year he became a tutor at the Academy of Fine Arts in Stuttgart.

In 1984 he became the first western photographer to work officially in East-Germany with East-German models. He collaborated with the Fashion Designer Helmut Lang on the project "Fashion in East-Berlin" published in magazines such as Wiener and Style & the family tunes.

In 1985 Kodak commissioned Pawlok for the series "Around the World in 40 days" shown at the 1986 photokina, Cologne in a solo exhibition.

In 1988 he started working with the Polaroid 20×24-inch camera and moved to TriBeCa in New York City to work on his art projects. In the same year he invented the transfer technique using the 20×24 Polaroid Camera to start his series "Photography Paintings". With this series Werner Pawlok emphasizes his intention to dispel the traditional categorisation separating photography from painting. The concept of the shots aims to evoke the style of European classical portrait painting but without imitating or even quoting it.

In the same year Gunter Sachs became one of Pawlok's first collectors.

Also in 1988 Werner Pawlok photographed Leigh Bowery, an Australian performance artist.

Following on, in 1989, was the "Transfers" series.  From Pawlok's experimental handling of processes, techniques and image carrier media emerges a pictorial style that doesn't need visual reference within reality. With "Transfers", the photographer becomes a painter. Faces and flowers are the most prevalent subjects. A large format Polaroid, which is transferred through a complex process to a heavy, rough-textured hand made paper or canvas, produces the image. The calculated exchange of the photochemical layer simultaneously combining with the amalgam of coincidence. Here, Pawlok is a painter and alchemist at the same time. Due to their so thoroughly induced metamorphoses into a new and singular pictorial space, the results of this manipulation could easily be named transmutations. Within the peculiar profundity these works radiate, the developing process seems to continue to have an effect. Their materiality reminds one of an artistic principle of modernity which doesn't make use of pictorial means solely in order to express, but elevates them to be the purpose themselves. Pawlok´s unique Polaroids became part of the Polaroid Collection.

In 1990 he began with his cycle "Stars & Paints" a series  of one hundred 20×24-inch unique Polaroids of celebrities including Sir Peter Ustinov, John Malkovich, Roman Polanski, Dizzy Gillespie, Jean Paul Gaultier, Juliette Binoche and Jane Birkin. The desire to be someone else lights up the star-cult of our times. The step from the juggler on the ramp of a medieval fairground booth to the hype of the media world is much smaller than expected. The idea is ingenious and perfidious at the same time: They, the Stars, have engaged in this game, they slipped over on the banana skin that was handed to them. They can be given credit for this, the Stars, the real ones, because the memory of the, should we say, precarious origin of their prominence is still alive within the best. Maybe it is even the pleasure of a hide-and-seek game that tempts these people, whom we admire so much, to engage in the set that Werner Pawlok provides and that drives Pedro Almodóvar, director and connoisseur of the women, to "quote himself" or that causes John Malkovich, the ghost-lighting chameleon amongst the Hollywood actors, to reveal parts of his innermost self in front of this seemingly archaic camera. There is one image within the series, a self-portrait of the initiators of the project, in which some waggishness seems to be sparkling out of the picture. We, the viewers possibly benefit from a secret agreement between both the photographer and photographed person, which knows about the fragility of success on stage.

In May 1992 Edition Domberger, published under the patronage of King Juan Carlos of Spain, and documenta IX, the edition COLUMBUS - IN SEARCH OF A NEW TOMORROW, featured the work of 37 artists including Joseph Beuys, Max Bill, Sandro Chia, Eduardo Chillida, Christo, Roy Lichtenstein, Robert Longo, Antoni Tàpies and more. Werner Pawlok was part of the project with his Crying Monkey, portraying a monkey in a crucified position on golden leaves. In 1993 Werner Pawlok completed the series "Crying Animals" photographed with the 20×24 Polaroid camera.

Also in 1992 Mercedes-Benz commissioned Pawlok to photograph their collection of classic cars, icons of motoring including the unique Silver Arrows racing cars driven by the likes of Fangio and Moss.
For this, his "Master Pieces" series, he again used the 20×24 Polaroid camera, transferring the Polaroid negative film onto canvas and thus creating an impression similar to painting.

In 1996 he started with the cycle of images named "Dantes Commedia", an interpretation of Dante Aligheri's Divina Commedia or Divine Comedy. The first time that Werner Pawlok produced a full series, of 33 pictures, using digital imaging. He does not illustrate the selected cantos, he rather conceptualises visionary image metaphors which reflect Dante's verses with a resolute gesture but still develop their own vocabulary. Dante's Inferno is cone shaped. On Pawloks transparent Cibachrome the image appears boosted, dynamic: a fervent maelstrom has seized its personnel and keeps it banished; on the other hand, the Catharsis Mountain exudes an ethereal fluidity which reminds us of the path of light which the poet walks on in his phantastic journey. Pawloks version is not trying to comment on the verses but seeks creative inspiration, an associative method that leads to precise image settings, which add themselves to an open series without joining a cohesive cycle.

In 2000 he traveled Europe to photograph the project Stars for UNICEF, portraits of European Stars such as Ewan McGregor, Patricia Kaas, Andrzej Wajda, Nacho Duato and more.

2001 Pawlok participated in the exhibition tour Images beyond the Naked Eye, together with Duane Michals, Robert Lebeck, Sarah Moon, Sebastião Salgado and others.

2002 Pawlok started his portrait cycle of "Views - Faces of Literature", a series of writers like, Martin Walser, T.C. Boyle, Henning Mankell, Amos Oz, Jonathan Franzen, Richard Ford, Salman Rushdie, Ian Rankin, Ken Follett, Armin Mueller-Stahl, Ian McEwan, Michael Ondaatje, Siri Hustvedt, Leon de Winter, Jeffrey Eugenides and more. At the Kaufleuten, probably the best-known club in Zurich, readings of contemporary writers from all over the world are a part of its program. There is limited time for Werner Pawlok and his project. It is always the same installation, a ring-flash and the camera with a Polaroid film. Always the same light too, which meets different ages, vistas and facial landscapes. Pawlok explains the procedure to Jonathan Franzen: Only two shots, pressing the release twice. One of the portraits is for the author, the other one becomes part of Pawlok's contemporary writers series. A distance of only twenty centimeters separates the author and the camera. What does the face reveal of this life? The reactions towards the portraying situation vary: from easygoing to superior, and open but also irritated by this close look that searches for the way inside. "You are not going to look into my soul", Franzen says arranging his glasses like a shield.

2004 and 2013 he travels to Cuba to photograph for his series "Cuba - expired". In his pictures Werner Pawlok tells about the morbid charm of an old Caribbean metropolis, showing a part of history by themselves. The splendour and misery of the Cuban utopia, the projector cubano, melt together so obviously in these abandoned palaces of the old sugar-aristocracy. Pawlok tracks this sunken world during his rambles through Havana.

Exhibitions 
 2014:  "Blütezeit", DZ BANK Kunstsammlung, ART FOYER (Group Show) 
 2014:  "glamourARTfair, Amsterdam", Leigh Bowery Photo Installation (Group Show)
 2014:  "HATS and HEADS", Gallery Tobias Hirschmann, Berlin (Group Show)
 2013:  "Sammlung Gunter Sachs", Kunsthalle Schweinfurt (Group Show)
 2013:  "Views - faces of literature", Artweek Hamburg, Hamburg (Solo Show)
 2013:  "Otherness. I is somebody else", Portraits Leigh Bowery by Werner Pawlok, Espace Culturel Louis Vuitton, Paris (Group Show)
 2013:  "Im Zeichen der Feder", Gallery Tobias Hirschmann, Berlin (Group Show)
 2013:  "Metro - Pole", Gallery AEA, Berlin (Solo Show)
 2012:  "Xtravaganza - Staging Leigh Bowery", Kunsthalle Vienna, Museumsquartier halle 1, Austria (Group Show)
 2012:  "Views - faces of literature", Literaturhaus, Stuttgart (Solo Show)
 2012:  "Werner Pawlok - Fotografien", Kunsthalle Messmer, Riegel (Solo Show)
 2012:  "Polaroid", The Finnish Museum of Photography, Helsinki (Group Show)
 2012:  "Polaroid (Im)possible - the Westlicht Collection", Westlicht, Wien, Austria (Group Show)
 2009:  "Cuba Expired", Oliver Gordon Gallery, Toronto, Kanada (Solo Show)
 1999:  "Augenlust - erotische Kunst im 20. Jahrhundert", Kunsthaus Hannover, Hannover (Group Show)
 1997:  "Dantes Commedia", Gallery Benden & Klimczak, Köln (Solo Show)
 1996:  "Transfers", Gallery Raab Boukamel, London (Solo Show)
 1994:  "Crying Animals", Gallery Hans Mayer, Düsseldorf (Solo Show)
 1992:  "Photography Paintings", Kunstverein Siegen (Solo Show) "Photography Paintings", Brandenburgische Kunstsammlung, Cottbus (Solo Show)
 1991:  "Colour", Hamilton´s Gallery, London (Group Show)
 1991:  "Photography Paintings", Fotografie Forum International, Frankfurt am Main (Solo Show)

Publications 
 Werner Pawlok - cuba - expired, Frederking & Thaler Verlag Gmbh 
 Werner Pawlok - made in Cuba, Avenso 
 FROM POLAROID TO IMPOSSIBLE - the Westlicht Collection, Hatje Cantz 
 Leigh Bowery, Violette Edition, London 
 PHOTOGRAPHY IN THE FAST LANE, Mercedes Benz through the lens of famous Photographers, 2011
 AUGENLUST, Erotische Kunst im 20. Jahrhundert, Kunsthaus Hannover, 
 Emerging bodies/Akt in Polaroid, Edition Stemmle, 2000 
 Master Pieces, Fotobuch, Edition Cantz, 1992 
 Photography Paintings, Edition Stemmle, 
 Transfers, Fotobuch, Edition Cantz, 1992 
 Das Goldene Zeitalter, Edition Cantz, 1991
 Die Bildermacher, 1991 
 Selections 3, Polaroid Collections, 1986

References

External links
 

Photographers from Baden-Württemberg
Artists from Stuttgart
1953 births
Living people